Broomhill is a place name, and may refer to:


In Canada 
Broomhill, Manitoba, a community in Albert Rural Municipality

In England 
Broomhill, Frome Vale, a district near Fishponds in north Bristol
Broom Hill, Bristol, sometimes written Broomhill, a district near Brislington in south Bristol
Broom Hill, London, sometimes written Broomhill, a district of Orpington
Broomhill, Northumberland, a village
Broomhill, Sheffield, suburb of Sheffield
 Broomhill (ward), electoral ward of Sheffield
 An ancient parish in Kent lost to the sea in the 13th century, parts of which are now in New Romney
Broomhill Park, a park in Ipswich, Suffolk; sometimes spelled Broom Hill

In Northern Ireland 
 Broomhill, County Armagh

In Scotland 
Broomhill, Aberdeen
Broomhill, Glasgow
Broomhill railway station, Highland

See also
 Broom Hill (disambiguation)
 Broom-Hilda
 Broomhall (disambiguation)
 Broomehill